Leptosphaeria woroninii is a plant pathogen.

References

Fungal plant pathogens and diseases
Pleosporales
Fungi described in 1972